Frimatic–de Gribaldy was a French professional cycling team that existed from 1968 to 1971. It was created by former rider Jean de Gribaldy. Its main sponsor was French refrigerator manufacturer Frimatic.

References

External links

Cycling teams based in France
Defunct cycling teams based in France
1968 establishments in France
1971 disestablishments in France
Cycling teams established in 1968
Cycling teams disestablished in 1971